This list is of the Historic Sites of Japan located within the Prefecture of Kanagawa.

National Historic Sites
As of 1 August 2019, sixty-three Sites have been designated as being of national significance, including the Old Hakone Road, which spans the prefectural borders with Shizuoka.

|-
|}

Prefectural Historic Sites
As of 1 August 2019, twenty-five Sites have been designated as being of prefectural importance.

Municipal Historic Sites
As of 1 May 2019, a further one hundred and thirty-one Sites have been designated as being of municipal importance.

Registered Historic Sites
As of 1 August 2019, one Monument has been registered (as opposed to designated) as an Historic Site at a national level.

See also

 Cultural Properties of Japan
 Sagami Province
 Musashi Province
 Kamakura Museum of National Treasures
 List of Places of Scenic Beauty of Japan (Kanagawa)
 List of Cultural Properties of Japan - paintings (Kanagawa)
 List of Cultural Properties of Japan - historical materials (Kanagawa)

References

External links
  Cultural Properties in Kanagawa Prefecture

Kanagawa Prefecture
 Kanagawa